Dwight Randolph Winn (born June 9, 1974) is an American former professional baseball player. He played all or parts of 13 seasons in Major League Baseball (MLB), primarily as an outfielder. Winn was a switch hitter, and threw right-handed. He made his major league debut in 1998 with the Tampa Bay Devil Rays, then went on to play for the Seattle Mariners, San Francisco Giants, New York Yankees, and St. Louis Cardinals. He played in the 2002 Major League Baseball All-Star Game. He currently works as an analyst for Giants broadcasts on NBC Sports Bay Area.

Early life
Winn was born in Los Angeles but attended San Ramon Valley High School. He attended Santa Clara University and played baseball and basketball (where he played guard alongside former roommate and future NBA Most Valuable Player Steve Nash).

Professional career
Winn was selected in the third round (65th overall) of the 1995 MLB draft by the Florida Marlins.

Tampa Bay Devil Rays (1998–2002) 
Winn was taken by the Tampa Bay Devil Rays in the 1997 MLB expansion draft.

Winn made his MLB debut on May 11, 1998 as a pinch runner for the Devil Rays. On October 3, 1999, he hit an inside-the-park grand slam against the New York Yankees. Winn represented Tampa Bay in the 2002 All-Star Game.

Seattle Mariners (2003–05) 
On October 29, 2002, he was traded to the Seattle Mariners as compensation for Lou Piniella being hired to manage the Devil Rays.

Winn recorded 462 hits, 40 home runs, 56 stolen bases, 96 doubles, 17 triples, and a .299 batting average over a 2½ year period.

San Francisco Giants (2005–09) 
Prior to the trading deadline on July 31, 2005, Seattle traded Winn to the Giants for catcher Yorvit Torrealba and minor league pitcher Jesse Foppert. Despite a late-season rally, the 2005 Giants finished third in the NL West, with a 75-87 record. In his 231 at bats as a Giant, Winn had a .359 batting average, a .680 slugging percentage, 26 RBI, and hit 14 home runs. By comparison, in his 386 at bats with the Mariners that year, Winn was batting .275, slugging .391, had 37 RBIs, and hit 6 home runs.

In his two months with the Giants, Winn equaled his career best for home runs in a season. For his performance in the month of September, Winn was named National League Player of the Month; he recorded 51 hits and had a batting average of .447. Winn's 51 hits were the most in one month by a Giant in over 30 years. Winn had a career-high hitting streak of 20 games. He signed a three-year, $23.25M contract extension with the Giants the following offseason.

In 2006 Winn played in 149 games making 635 plate appearances and saw his average, OBP and slugging drop to .262/.324/.396.

In 2007 Winn played in 155 games making 653 plate appearances and saw his average, OBP and slugging rebound closer to his career averages .300/.353/.455.

In 2008, Winn repeated his 155 games and made 667 plate appearances. His average, OBP and slugging were .306/.363/.426.

In 149 games in 2009, Winn made 597 plate appearances while averaging .262, getting on base .318 and slugging .353. He hit just two home runs and his slugging declined for three straight years. He did record his 200th stolen base and 500th walk during that year. Winn became a free agent following the season.

New York Yankees  and St. Louis Cardinals (2010) 
On February 8, 2010, Winn signed a one-year deal with the New York Yankees. On May 28, he was designated for assignment as Curtis Granderson was activated from the disabled list. On May 28, 2010, he was officially released by the Yankees. He signed with the St. Louis Cardinals on June 5, and finished the season with them, becoming a free agent at the end of the season.

Baltimore Orioles (2011) 
Winn signed a minor league contract with the Baltimore Orioles on February 3, 2011. Four days after his request for an unconditional release was granted on March 28, he announced his retirement as an active player on April 1.

He appeared on the ballot for the National Baseball Hall of Fame and Museum 2016 election and earned zero votes.

Career statistics 
In 1,717 games spanning 13 seasons, Winn posted a .284 batting average (1,759-for-6,186) with 863 runs, 367 doubles, 59 triples, 110 home runs, 662 RBI, 215 stolen bases, 526 base on balls, .343 on-base percentage and .416 slugging percentage. He recorded a .992 fielding percentage playing at all three outfield positions.

Broadcasting career
In 2021 Winn joined the San Francisco Giants' broadcast crew as a part-time color analyst.

Personal life
In 2002, five days after being traded to Seattle, Winn married his college sweetheart, Blessings Robertson.

See also

 List of Major League Baseball career stolen bases leaders
 List of Major League Baseball players to hit for the cycle

References

External links

Winn player profile page at Scout.com

1974 births
Living people
2006 World Baseball Classic players
20th-century African-American sportspeople
21st-century African-American sportspeople
African-American baseball players
African-American basketball players
American League All-Stars
American men's basketball players
Baseball players from Los Angeles
Basketball players from Los Angeles
Brevard County Manatees players
Durham Bulls players
Elmira Pioneers players
Kane County Cougars players
Major League Baseball broadcasters
Major League Baseball center fielders
New York Yankees players
People from San Ramon, California
Portland Sea Dogs players
San Francisco Giants announcers
San Francisco Giants players
San Francisco Giants scouts
Santa Clara Broncos baseball players
Santa Clara Broncos men's basketball players
Seattle Mariners players
St. Louis Cardinals players
Tampa Bay Devil Rays players
World Baseball Classic players of the United States